James P. Gray II (born August 18, 1953) is an American politician who is the Kentucky Secretary of Transportation in the administration of Governor Andy Beshear. He is the former mayor of Lexington, Kentucky (Lexington-Fayette Urban County Government) from 2011 to 2019. Gray served as the city's vice-mayor from 2006 to 2010 before being elected mayor in November 2010. Gray won re-election to another four-year term on November 4, 2014. In 2016, he ran for the United States Senate seat held by U.S. Senator Rand Paul. Gray won the May 17 Democratic primary with nearly 60% of the vote but lost the November 8 general election to Paul. Gray was Chairman and CEO of Gray Construction, an engineering, design, and construction company headquartered in Lexington. Once elected, he took an advisory role as Chair of the Board of Directors to focus on his role as mayor.

Early life and education
Gray was raised in Glasgow, Kentucky, the third oldest of Lois and James Norris Gray's six children. He started his college career at Emory University in Atlanta but returned home to help out with the family business when his father died in 1972. He then enrolled at Vanderbilt University, commuting between Glasgow and Nashville while earning a degree in history. After graduating in 1975, he joined the family construction business full-time.

In 1996, after more than 20 years in the construction industry, Gray accepted an offer to become a Loeb Fellow at Harvard University's Graduate School of Design.  

The Loeb Fellowship program is created for accomplished practitioners "to pause, study, and reflect at a great University [to] enable those who designed and built our cities to return with renewed insight and energy."

Family business
Gray's father started the family construction business in 1960, and it has since grown to become one of the twenty largest design-build firms in the country.

Located in the historic Wolf-Wile Building on Lexington's Main St., the Gray Companies include Gray Construction, WS Construction and Gray-I.C.E. Builders, with offices in Anaheim, Birmingham, Bowling Green, Versailles, Lexington, and Tokyo.

The Gray Companies specialize in the design, construction and renovation of large facilities—automotive plants, distribution centers and manufacturing plants—as well as retail and mixed-use developments both in the U.S. and abroad. Among clients for whom major projects have been completed are BMW, CVS, Dollar General, Hitachi, Hyundai, Pepsi Beverages, Procter & Gamble, Siemens and Toyota.

Gray Construction was an industry pioneer in offering, under one roof, both the design and construction of buildings, a practice now widespread in the construction industry. To promote this new concept, Jim Gray co-founded the Design-Build Institute of America in 1993.

After supervising the sales and marketing operations of Gray Construction, Jim Gray became president and CEO of Gray Inc. and the Gray Companies in October 2004, serving until 2009.  During his tenure, revenue grew 38%.

Political career

Early career

In 1972, at the age of 19, Gray became the second youngest person ever elected as a delegate to the Democratic National Convention, which was held in Miami.

Gray's next foray into politics came two decades later when Kentucky Governor Brereton Jones asked him to chair his Committee on Quality and Efficiency. The committee produced the "Wake-Up Call for Kentucky Report," an audit of executive branch spending that included recommendations to eliminate $1 billion in wasteful state spending.

Gray's first run for office was a bid for Lexington Mayor in 2002. He lost the primary and endorsed Teresa Isaac, who was elected.

Vice Mayor of Lexington
In 2006, Gray ran for one of three Council-at-Large seats in the Lexington City Council and was elected. As the largest vote-getter among the council-at-large candidates, Gray became Vice Mayor and served from 2007 to 2010.

In his role as Vice Mayor, Gray positioned himself as a guardian of rate-payers and tax-payers, challenging Mayor Jim Newberry on overspending at the Blue Grass Airport and potential water-rate hikes. He opposed the Owen County Kentucky-American water treatment plant that cost Fayette County rate payers $164 million.

Mayor of Lexington
In 2010, Gray entered the race for mayor, challenging the incumbent Jim Newberry.

During the campaign, Gray developed the "Fresh Start Plan," containing a pledge to run the government like a good business, with increased transparency and efficiency and with reduced spending and debt.

In November 2010, Gray defeated Newberry 53% to 46%.

Before his first day as mayor, Gray had the entire mayor's office moved from the 12th floor of Lexington's government center to a first-floor ballroom, creating an open office atmosphere that was inspired by his own office at Gray. To learn about operations of a city government, the newly elected mayor paid a visit to Mayor Michael Bloomberg.

Gray has publicly stated that his administration is focused on three areas: creating jobs, making government more efficient, and building Lexington into a great American city.

With Louisville Mayor Greg Fischer, Gray launched a joint Lexington-Louisville economic-development initiative in conjunction with the Brookings Institution. The Bluegrass Economic Advancement Movement (BEAM) project is aimed at building the bluegrass region of Kentucky as a global center for advanced manufacturing.

Gray was re-elected mayor by a wide margin in 2014.

In 2018 Lexington was ranked by WalletHub as the 5th-best-run city in the country.

U.S. Senate campaign

On January 26, 2016, Gray announced that he was running for the United States Senate in 2016 for the seat then and currently held by U.S. Senator and former presidential candidate Rand Paul. The senate race was described as an "uphill battle" for Gray. Gray won the Democratic nomination for the U.S. Senate in Kentucky on May 17, 2016.

On November 8, 2016, Paul defeated Gray 57% to 43%.

U.S. House campaign 
On December 5, 2017, Gray announced that he would run for the United States House of Representatives, entering the Democratic primary for Kentucky's 6th congressional district. He was defeated in the May 22, 2018, Democratic primary by Amy McGrath.

Kentucky Secretary of Transportation
On December 2, 2019, Kentucky governor-elect Andy Beshear, announced in a news conference that Gray will be appointed as Kentucky Secretary of Transportation, Gray was sworn in on December 10th.

Personal life

A lifelong collector of modern art, Gray created and helped endow the Gray Art Experience, an annual art-appreciation trip to New York City for University of Kentucky Gaines Fellows.

Gray was married for seven years and has no children. In 2005, Gray publicly announced that he is gay.

References

External links

 Mayor Jim Gray Lexington-Fayette Urban County Government website
 Jim Gray Campaign Official Jim Gray Campaign website
 

|-

1953 births
Candidates in the 2016 United States Senate elections
Gay politicians
Kentucky city council members
Kentucky Democrats
American LGBT city council members
LGBT mayors of places in the United States
LGBT people from Kentucky
Living people
Mayors of Lexington, Kentucky
State cabinet secretaries of Kentucky